The Hair the TV the Baby & the Band is the fourth studio album by the indie rock band Imperial Teen. It is the follow-up to On (2002), and was released in the U.S. on August 21, 2007, by Merge Records. The album was #38 on Rolling Stones list of the Top 50 Albums of 2007.

Track listing

References

2007 albums
Imperial Teen albums
Merge Records albums